Greet Minnen and Alison Van Uytvanck were the defending champions, but chose not to defend their title.

Coco Gauff and Caty McNally won the title, defeating Kaitlyn Christian and Alexa Guarachi in the final, 6–2, 6–2.

Seeds

Draw

Draw

References

External Links
 Draw

2019 Doubles
BGL Luxembourg Open – Doubles
2019 in Luxembourgian tennis